SOE may refer to:

Organizations
 State-owned enterprise
 Special Operations Executive, a British World War II clandestine sabotage and resistance organisation 
Special Operations Executive in the Netherlands, or Englandspiel
 Society of Operations Engineers, a British professional organization
 Sony Online Entertainment, a game developing company, now known as Daybreak Game Company

Science and technology
 Soap opera effect, the visual result of motion smoothing functions found in many modern televisions
 Splicing by overlap extension polymerase chain reaction, a variant of polymerase chain reaction
 Standard Operating Environment, computer operating system and associated software

Other uses
 Souanké Airport (IATA airport code), an airport in the Republic of the Congo
 South African Police Star for Outstanding Service (post-nominal SOE)
 State of emergency, a condition in which a government is granted additional powers in times of peril
 SO Emyrne, the football section of a sports club in Madagascar

See also
 Soe (disambiguation)